The state's crops include strawberry, Fragaria × ananassa.

Production 
This crop is grown in all counties and the City of Baltimore.

Disease 
 (Botrytis cinerea) is a common problem as it is around the world. Fernández-Ortuño et al., 2014 finds populations here have resistance to fludioxonil and to thiophanate-methyl. Many are multiresistant.

Hu et al.,  also find widespread resistance to SDHIs here. There appears to be no resistance to benzovindiflupyr here. This is because it is a new substance.

Much of the phytoplasma research here in the 1990s was conducted by the Jomantiene group at USDA ARS Beltsville. This is also the first report of STRAWB2 anywhere outside of Florida.

 is common here. This is a disease with an uncertain etiology thought to involve several combined pathogens.

Spraying 
University of Maryland Extension recommends fungicides: Lime sulfur, JMS Stylet Oil, Kocide, Captan, Thiram, Sulfur, Rally, Pristine, Elevate, Switch, Phostrol, and Ph-D. For insecticides: Provado Admire or Actara, Brigade, Malathion, and Sevin. (These are recommended for all small fruit, so not just strawberry, but also brambles (blackberry and raspberry), blueberry, and grape.)

References

Other resources 
 The University of Maryland, College Park maintains information for commercial growers: 

Economy of Maryland
Agriculture in the United States
Strawberries
Strawberry production